Donald Crichton Alexander (May 22, 1921 – February 2, 2009) was a tax lawyer and Nixon administration official.

Alexander was appointed Commissioner of Internal Revenue by President Richard Nixon in May 1973, and was replaced in February 1977, early in the Jimmy Carter administration.

Alexander resisted attempts by Nixon to use the Internal Revenue Service (IRS) to investigate Nixon's political enemies, resulting in a string of attempts by Nixon to fire him. Early on in his tenure as Commissioner, he dismantled the IRS Special Service Staff, which had been used to pursue detractors of the administration and its policies in Vietnam.

Alexander served in the Army in World War II, receiving the Bronze Star and the Silver Star. After graduating Yale College and Harvard Law School, he began his career as a tax lawyer, which included positions at Covington & Burling and Akin Gump, where he worked at the time of his death.

References

1921 births
2009 deaths
Commissioners of Internal Revenue
Nixon administration personnel
Yale College alumni
Harvard Law School alumni
Recipients of the Silver Star
People associated with Covington & Burling
Burials at Arlington National Cemetery
Tax lawyers
United States Army personnel of World War II